The Clermont Gaelic Football Club is a Gaelic football club situated in Clermont-Ferrand, France.

History

Origins and creation of the club 
Under the initiative of two students, Ruairi Millane and Nicolas Chatain and with the help of the organisation "La Ballade Irlandaise", the first training session took place on May 17, 2008. Fifteen players were present.

In September 2008, regular training sessions began, taking place on Thursdays.

The club's first ever match took place in November 2008 against Nantes. The team organised a tournament in Clermont-Ferrand in March 2009 with teams from Paris, Rennes, Nantes and Lyon participating.

2010-2011 season 

The club was dormant during the 2010 season but the team participated in 3 rounds of Federal Championship in 2011.

2011-2012 season 

During the 2011–2012 season the club saw its membership swell to around 30 players. Now training twice a week (7pm on Wednesdays, 10am on Saturdays), the team finished runners-up at the Toulouse tournament and finished third at both the Clermont and Lyon tournaments.

In March 2012, the club purchased its first set of jerseys, and would now be playing in yellow and blue, the traditional colours of the Auvergne region. The yellow would also serve as a tribute to the colours of the team's first ever opponents; Nantes. The 2012 season also saw the club win their first piece of silverware, also known as a trophy. As they finished the season by winning the French & Anglo-Norman Islands Championship Shield, or in more Gaelic Athletic Association-friendly language, the French Intermediate Championship.

2012-2013 season

Lutins Tournament 

The team started the 2012–2013 season by finishing runners-up in a charity tournament in Niort. The team followed this up with wins against Sauxillanges and Lyon in friendly matches.

First round 

During the first round of the Federal 2012-2013 Championship in Toulouse on February 23, 2013, Clermont beat Lyon for the first time in official competition by a scoreline of 18 points to 3. Defeats against Paris and Toulouse followed, but thanks to a big win against Niort, the team finished the tournament in third place.

Second round 

Missing key players in attack and defence through injury, the team found the early goings at the Lyon tournament tough. A victory over Lyon B was followed by a heavy defeat to Toulouse. A defeat to Paris in the semi-finals meant that the team would play for third place for the second round in a row. The third place play-off was a repeat of an earlier pool match as Clermont beat Toulouse to finish in third place.

Third round 
The third round of the Championship took place in Niort. Clermont once again finished the tournament in third place, meaning the team were still in with a chance of qualifying for the Elite/Senior Finals with a strong performance during the final round of the Championship which was due to take place in Clermont. The team failed to qualify for the Elite/Senior Finals but would look to retain the Shield/Intermediate title they had won the year before.

French Championship Finals Saint Brieux, 15 June 2013 
Victories over Lorient, Coutances and Niort meant that Clermont would contest their second consecutive Shield/Intermediate final. The final was an extremely close encounter against the home side Saint Brieux. It took extra-time to find a winner but that winner was Clermont who won their second French Shield/Intermediate Championship in a row.

2013-2014 season 
Clermont won their first ever Federal Championship tournament in Lyon when they finished joint-winners with Toulouse as the final had to be cancelled due to a storm. This was followed up with a fourth-place finish in the second round in Toulouse. A fifth place (out of 10 teams) finish in the third round tournament in Niort meant that Clermont only just missed out on qualifying for the Elite/Senior Championship Finals for the first time. The team would once again defend their Shield/Intermediate title at the finals which would take place in Clermont.

French Championship Finals - Clermont-Ferrand, 7 June 2014 
For the third year in a row Clermont were crowned Shield (now named Honneur)/Intermediate Champions of France. No team registered more than 5 points against the team whilst the attack scored 15 goals and 28 points in just 4 matches.

2014-2015 season 
The first half of the 2014–2015 season would see the club compete at a European level for the first time in its history as the team would take part in the GAA European Championship Finals in Maastricht.

2014 European Championship Finals 
On the 17th of October 12, Clermont Gaels players travelled through France, Luxembourg, Belgium and the Netherlands to Maastricht where the 2014 European Championship Finals were taking place. The tournament took place on the 18th with nearly 30 men's and women's teams from all over Europe in attendance.

Clermont were drawn in Group B of the Intermediate/Junior qualifying groups alongside Amsterdam B, Rennes, Düsseldorf and Rovigo. The team came up against familiar foes Rennes in the first match and a dominant first half display ensured a first ever European victory for the Bougnats. The next opponents were a very heavily Irish-influenced Düsseldorf side. Clermont put in a very strong performance against the predominantly Irish side and secured a relatively easy victory in the second group match.

The B team of the reigning 15 a side European Champions, Amsterdam awaited Clermont in the next group match which would essentially decide who finished as Group B winners. A poor first half from Clermont where they failed to register a single point meant that Amsterdam B went into halftime with an almost unassailable lead. Clermont dominated the second half however, managing to close the gap to just 3 points at one stage and had a couple of chances to level the match but ultimately failed to do so.

The team recorded a victory over Italian newcomers Rovigo in the final group game and as a result finished Runners-up in Group B. This ensured that Clermont would qualify for the Intermediate semi-finals and were drawn against Group A winners Frankfurt. Frankfurt, with an almost entirely Irish side were too strong however and won the match to qualify for the finals. The team earned a third-place finish in the European Intermediate Championship in their first ever appearance at a European event.

Results and silverware

Squad lists - men's team

Clermont Gaels Squad (2011/2012)

Clermont Gaels Squad (2012/2013)

Clermont Gaels Squad (2013/2014)

Clermont Gaels Squad (2014/2015)

References

External links 
Official Site
Vidéo de France 3 Auvergne
European GAA Website

Gaelic football clubs in Europe
Sports clubs in France
Sport in Clermont-Ferrand